The Schweich Lectures on Biblical Archaeology are a series of lectures delivered and published under the auspices of the British Academy. The Leopold Schweich Trust Fund, set up in 1907, was a gift from Miss Constance Schweich in memory of her father. It provided for three public lectures to be delivered annually (now triennially) on subjects related to ‘the archaeology, art, history, languages and literature of Ancient Civilization with reference to Biblical Study’. The three papers given by each lecturer are published together in book form, by Oxford University Press. There have been many reprintings.

Catalogue of titles
Book details are preceded by the year of delivery of the lectures. The date of publication is usually a year or two later.
1908. Modern Research as illustrating the Bible. by S.R. Driver
1909. The Composition of the Book of Isaiah in the Light of History and Archaeology. by Robert H Kennett
1910. The Early Poetry of Israel in its Physical and Social Origins. by George Adam Smith
1911. The Philistines: Their History and Civilization. by R. A. Stewart Macalister
1912. The Relations between the Laws of Babylonia and the Laws of the Hebrew Peoples. by C H W Johns
1913. Jewish and Christian Apocalypses. by F. Crawford Burkitt
1914. Une Communauté Judéo-Araméenne à Éléphantine, en Égypte, aux VIe et Ve Siècles av. J.-C. by A van Hoonacker
1915. The Text of the Old Testament. by Édouard Naville
1916. Legends of Babylon and Egypt in relation to Hebrew Tradition. by Leonard W. King
1917. Israel’s Settlement in Canaan: The Biblical Tradition and its Historical Background. by C F Burney
1918. The Hittites. by A. E. Cowley
1919. Lectures on the Apocalypse. by R. H. Charles
1920. The Septuagint and Jewish Worship: A Study in Origins. by H St John Thackeray
1921. The Relations between Arabs and Israelites prior to the Rise of Islam. by D S Margoliouth
1922. Campaigns in Palestine from Alexander the Great. by Israel Abrahams
1923. The Samaritans: Their History, Doctrines and Literature. by Moses Gaster
1924. Kings of the Hittites. by David George Hogarth
1925. The Religion of Ancient Palestine in the Light of Archaeology. by Stanley A Cook
1926. Palestine in General History. by Theodore H. Robinson, J. W. Hunkin & F.C. Burkitt
1927. The Apocalypse in Art. by Montague Rhodes James
1928. The Old and New Testaments in Muslim Religious Art. by Thomas W Arnold
1929. A Comparative Study of the Literatures of Egypt, Palestine, and Mesopotamia: Egypt’s Contribution to the Literature of the Ancient World. by T. Eric Peet
1930. Ancient Synagogues in Palestine and Greece. by E L Sukenik
1931. Ancient Hebrew Social Life and Custom as Indicated in Law, Narrative and Metaphor. by R. H. Kennett
1932. Recent Developments in the Textual Criticism of the Greek Bible. by Frederic G. Kenyon
1933. Babylonian Menologies and the Semitic Calendars. by S. Langdon
1934. Archaeological History of Iran. by Ernst E. Herzfeld
1935. The Origins of Early Semitic Ritual. by S. H. Hooke
1936. The Cuneiform Texts of Ras Shamra-Ugarit. by Claude F. A. Schaeffer
1937. Early Churches in Palestine. by John Winter Crowfoot
1938. The Work of the Chronicler: Its Purpose and its Date. by Adam C. Welch
1939. The Hebrew Bible in Art. by Jacob Leveen
1940. Isaiah Chapters XL–LV: Literary Criticism and History. by Sidney Smith
1941. The Cairo Geniza. by Paul E. Kahle
1942. Some Hellenistic Elements in Primitive Christianity. by Wilfred Knox
1943. The Poem of Job: A Literary Study with a New Translation. by William Barron Stevenson
1944. Semitic Writing, from Pictograph to Alphabet. by G. R. Driver
1945. Ideas of Divine Rule in the Ancient East. by C. J. Gadd
1946. The Text of the Epistles: A Disquisition upon the Corpus Paulinum. by G. Zuntz
1947. The Contribution of Demotic to the Study of Egyptian History. by Stephen Glanville
1948. From Joseph to Joshua: Biblical Traditions in the Light of Archaeology. by H. H. Rowley
1949. Les Archives de Mari dans ses Rapports avec l’Ancien Testament. by Georges Dossin
1950. The Phoenicians. by A. M. Honeyman
1951. The Original Form of the Old New Testament. by G. D. Kilpatrick
1953. Les Araméens. by André Dupont-Sommer
1955. Assyria and the Old Testament. by Max Mallowan
1957. Une collection de Paroles de Jésus récemment découverte: L’Évangile selon Thomas. by Henri-Charles Puech
1959. L’Archéologie et les Manuscrits de la Mer Morte. by Roland de Vaux
1961. Social Organisation of Pre-Islamic South Arabia. by Alfred Felix Landon Beeston
1963. Amorites and Canaanites. by Kathleen M. Kenyon
1965. Mari, Ugarit, Hamath: Archaeological Contributions from Ancient Syria to the Old Testament, by Harald Ingholt
1967. Ethiopia and the Bible. by Edward Ullendorff
1970. Hazor. by Yigael Yadin
1972. The Church of the Holy Sepulchre in Jerusalem. by Charles Coüasnon
1974. Mari et l'Ancien Testament. by André Parrot
1976. Some Aspects of Hittite Religion. by O.R. Gurney
1977. Manuscript, Society and Belief in Early Christian Egypt. by Colin H. Roberts
1983. Nebuchadrezzar and Babylon. by D. J. Wiseman
1984. Mari and the Early Israelite Experience. by Abraham Malamat
1986. The Variable Spellings of the Hebrew Bible. by James Barr
1989. The Bible in the Syriac Churches. by Sebastian Brock
1992. Ancient Interpretation of Sacred Books. by Henry Chadwick
1995. Translating the Bible: The Ethiopic Version of the Old Testament. by Michael A Knibb
1998. Symbol Systems of Ancient Palestine, in the light of Scarabs and Similar Seal-amulets. by Othmar Keel
2001. Idols of the People: Miniature Images of Clay in the Ancient Near East. by P.R.S. Moorey
2004. Ashkelon, Seaport of the Canaanites and the Philistines. by Lawrence Stager
2007. Ugaritic and the Beginnings of the West-Semitic Literary Tradition by Dennis G Pardee
2008. Archaeology and the Bible: A Broken Link? by Graham Davies
2010. Religion and Community in the Roman Near East: Constantine to Mahomet. by Fergus Millar
2013. Levantine Epigraphy and History in the Achaemenid Period. by André Lemaire
2016. Re-excavating Jerusalem: Archival Archaeology. by Kay Prag
2019. The Dead Sea Scrolls as archaeological artefacts, by George J. Brooke

Further reading
 Graham Davies: The Schweich Lectures and Biblical Archaeology. Oxford University Press, Oxford 2011,

External links
Schweich Lectures page on British Academy website

Series of books
Lecture series
Biblical archaeology